Kingston Grammar School Boat Club is a rowing club on the River Thames, based at Aragon Avenue, Thames Ditton, Elmbridge borough of Surrey.

History
The club was founded in 1889 and belongs to the Kingston Grammar School.

The club has produced multiple British champions, achieving particular success in the late 1980s to early 1990s under the leadership of head coach Peter Sheppard, during which time it was victorious in the Schools' Head of the River Race and produced a number of subsequent Olympic champions, including James Cracknell and Kieran West.

Honours

British champions

Schools' Head of the River Race

See also
Rowing on the River Thames

References

Rowing clubs in England
Rowing clubs of the River Thames
Scholastic rowing in the United Kingdom